The BMW M40 is an SOHC straight-four petrol engine which was produced from 1987–1994. It served as BMW's base model four-cylinder engine and was produced alongside the higher performance BMW M42 DOHC four-cylinder engine from 1989 onwards.

Compared with its M10 predecessor, the M40 uses a belt-driven camshaft, and hydraulic tappets. Like the M10, the M40 uses an iron block and an aluminium head. Fuel injection for the E30 versions is Bosch Motronic 1.3, and the E36 versions use Bosch Motronic 1.7.

Following the introduction of the BMW M43 engine in 1991, the M40 began to be phased out.

Versions

M40B16 

Applications:
1988–1994 E30 316i
1990–1994 E36 316i
1992–1993 Bertone Freeclimber 2

M40B18 

Applications:
1987–1994 E30 318i.

1992–1993 E36 318i

See also 
 List of BMW engines

References 

M40
Straight-four engines
Gasoline engines by model